The 2019 Gwangju Open was a professional tennis tournament played on hard courts. It was the 4th edition of the tournament which was part of the 2019 ATP Challenger Tour. It took place in Gwangju, South Korea between 13 and 19 May 2019.

Singles main-draw entrants

Seeds

 1 Rankings as of 6 May 2019.

Other entrants
The following players received wildcards into the singles main draw:
  Hong Seong-chan
  Lee Jea-moon
  Na Jung-woong
  Nam Ji-sung
  Son Ji-hoon

The following players received entry into the singles main draw using their ITF World Tennis Ranking:
  Bai Yan
  Shintaro Imai
  Kim Cheong-eui
  Konstantin Kravchuk
  Rio Noguchi

The following players received entry as alternates:
  Yusuke Takahashi
  Xia Zihao

The following players received entry from the qualifying draw:
  Hsieh Cheng-peng
  Song Min-kyu

Champions

Singles

  Jason Jung def.  Dudi Sela 6–4, 6–2.

Doubles

  Hsieh Cheng-peng /  Christopher Rungkat def.  Nam Ji-sung /  Song Min-kyu 6–3, 3–6, [10–6].

References

2019 ATP Challenger Tour
2019 in South Korean tennis
May 2019 sports events in South Korea
Gwangju Open